was a Japanese film director. He directed films from the 1940s to the 1960s.

Career 
Sugie was born in Shizuoka City, Shizuoka Prefecture (currently Shimizu Ward, Shizuoka City). After graduating from the Waseda University, Sugie joined P.C.L/Photo Chemical Laboratory (latter became Toho) in 1937. He worked as an assistant director for Kajiro Yamamoto, Shiro Toyoda, Yasujiro Shimazu, Mikio Naruse, and Akira Kurosawa. In 1950, he directed his first feature film, The Gate of Tokyo. Since then, Sugie directed romance dramas ("I Can't Say The Person's Name" and "Oblivion Petals"), youth movies such as "Janken Musume", " He even supported Toho as a location director who filmed in various places with the comedy starring the "Company President Series" and Crazy Cats.

Even on a public basis, mass production in the Japanese art world, with 6 in 1955, 7 in 1956, 5 in 1957, 4 in 1958, 4 in 1959, 5 in 1960, 6 in 1961 ... In that times, he continued to produced projects that came from the company one after another without a break, and left 68 directing works in less than 20 years. He was the flagship of program pictures centered on so-called comedy films and youth films, but Sugie himself said he wanted to direct suspense films, such as "Sanjûrokunin no jôkyaku" and "Death on the Mountain". Suspense works, which are rare among the director's works, are still highly evaluated.

From the latter half of the 1960s, the number of directors of theatrical films decreased due to the sunshine of the Japanese film industry, and he moved to the Toho TV Club to direct TV dramas.

Filmography 
 So Young, So Bright (ジャンケン娘 Janken musume) (1955)
 Romantic Daughters (Romansu musume) (1956)
 On Wings of Love (Ōatari sanshoku musume) aka Big Hit Three Color Daughters (1957)
 Sengoku gunto-den or Saga of the Vagabonds (1959) (Screen play by Akira Kurosawa)
 Daigaku no Wakadaishō (1961)

References

External links 
 

Japanese film directors
1913 births
1996 deaths